Gold and the Girl is a 1925 American silent western film directed by Edmund Mortimer and starring Buck Jones, Elinor Fair, and Bruce Gordon.

Plot
As described in a film magazine review, a representative of mining interests is determined to capture the crooks who are stealing the gold shipments. The villains execute the robberies by using the gold shipment trucks. The agent falls in love with the young woman whose father is the ringleader of the bandits. He effects her rescue and captures the gang but the father eludes the law by killing himself.

Cast

References

Bibliography
 Wes D. Gehring (2003). Carole Lombard, the Hoosier Tornado. Indiana Historical Society Press.

External links

1925 films
Films directed by Edmund Mortimer
American silent feature films
American black-and-white films
Fox Film films
1920s English-language films
1920s American films